AMC Entertainment Holdings, Inc. (d/b/a AMC Theatres, originally an abbreviation for American Multi-Cinema; often referred to simply as AMC and known in some countries as AMC Cinemas or AMC Multi-Cinemas) is an American movie theater chain founded in Kansas City, Missouri and now headquartered in Leawood, Kansas. It is the largest movie theater chain in the world. Founded in 1920, AMC has the largest share of the U.S. theater market ahead of Regal and Cinemark Theatres.

After acquiring Odeon Cinemas, UCI Cinemas, and Carmike Cinemas in 2016, it became the largest movie theater chain in the world. It has 2,807 screens in 353 theatres in Europe and 7,755 screens in 593 theatres in the United States.

The company is listed on the New York Stock Exchange; from 2012 to 2018, the Chinese conglomerate Wanda Group owned a majority stake in the company. Private equity firm Silver Lake Partners made a $600 million investment in AMC in September 2018, but the voting power of AMC shares is structured in such a way that Wanda Group still controlled the majority of AMC's board of directors.

Amid financial downturns caused by the COVID-19 pandemic, in January 2021 Wanda's ownership was increasingly diluted due to new financing by AMC, as well as short squeezes that resulted in Silver Lake converting its $600 million debt holding to equity. In early-February 2021, Wanda converted its Class B shares to Class A shares, thus reducing its voting power to less than 50%.

History 

AMC Theatres was formed in 1920 by Maurice, Edward, and Barney Dubinsky, who had been traveling the Midwest performing melodramas and tent shows with actress Jeanne Eagels. They purchased the Regent Theatre on 12th Street between Walnut and Grand in downtown Kansas City, Missouri. The Dubinskys eventually changed their name to Durwood, and the company they formed eventually became known as Durwood Theatres. The chain also had theaters in St. Joseph and Jefferson City, Missouri and Leavenworth and Topeka, Kansas.

When Edward's son Stanley left the U.S. Air Force after World War II he joined the company in 1945. He persuaded his father to build drive-in theaters and built them in St. Joseph, Jefferson City and Leavenworth. In 1947 they expanded further with the acquisition of the Liberty Theater in downtown Kansas City which they remodeled and renamed the Roxy. They won an anti-trust suit to enable them to show first-run product at the Roxy and went on to acquire all of the downtown cinemas in Kansas City including The Empire Theater, the Capri Theatre, the Midland Theatre and the Paramount Theatre.

In 1961, after Ed died, Stanley took control of Durwood Theatres, which by then was a small ten-theatre chain. With an interstate planned around Kansas City, Durwood looked to sites outside downtown and acquired two sites at a shopping center on Kansas City's Ward Parkway to build a 700-seat theater. As the sites could not be combined, they opened two theaters side-by-side as the Parkway Twin theatre in 1963. This was the company's first foray into using the multiplex model.  According to Variety, Stanley Durwood later claimed in 1962 that he "was standing in the lobby of his 600-seat Roxy in Kansas City mulling over its poor grosses, when he realized he could double his box office by adding a second screen and still operate with the same size staff."

Following the success of the Parkway Twin, AMC followed up with the Embassy 3 triplex at the Country Club Plaza; the Metro Plaza, a four-screen theater in Kansas City in 1966; and a six-screen theater in Omaha in 1969.

The industry quickly embraced the multiplex concept, where additional screens meant very little difference in staff and operating costs but resulted in a significant increase in profits. The concept also provided more film choices at one location, drawing bigger crowds. It also gave owners the flexibility to show big hits on more screens, and less reliance on any individual film that could turn out to be a bust.

Stanley renamed Durwood Theatres as American Royal Cinema on October 1, 1968 after the American Royal livestock and horse show, but the latter's producers sought an injunction and the name was changed to American Multi-Cinema, Inc.

Stanley began to apply military management and the insights of management science to revolutionize the movie theatre industry. As he later explained to Variety magazine, "We needed to define what our company was doing in the (exhibition) business. My dad wasn't that organized." It was structured under the belief that every customer was a "guest".

Growth 

By the 1980s, the company was experiencing strong growth and in 1983 it had its initial public offering. AMC Theatres built its first multiplex overseas in 1985, the 10-screen multiplex at The Point, Milton Keynes in the United Kingdom, and later opened additional sites in the UK such as in Dudley and Tamworth, Staffordshire. In October 1988, they announced a joint venture with United Artists and Cinema International Corporation (a partnership of Paramount Pictures and Universal Studios), to run their combined cinemas in the UK, Ireland under the AMC name, however, AMC pulled out of the joint venture in December 1988, and sold their U.K. assets, including their 12 cinemas, to the new entity (later called United Cinemas International) for $98 million and withdrew from the UK market.

In 1988, Kinepolis Brussels, the first megaplex in the world,  with 25 screens and 7,600 seats, was opened by Kinepolis, the European chain.

In 1995, AMC Theatres opened the first North American megaplex, the AMC Grand 24 in Dallas, Texas, a theater complex that could accommodate thousands. AMC continued to open other megaplex theaters, such as the AMC Hampton Towne Center 24 in Hampton, Virginia, and the chain's busiest theater in the US, the AMC Empire 25 in New York City near Times Square.

On December 13, 1996, AMC opened the Ontario Mills 30, a 30-screen theater in Ontario, California, which at the time was the largest multiplex in the world. AMC Theatres' megaplex theatres were a success overseas as well. In April 1996, they opened Canal City 13 in Fukuoka, Japan, which was followed on December 20, 1996, by the AMC Arrábida 20 in Porto, Portugal. In January 2002, the 16-screen Great Northern theatre was opened in Manchester in the U.K., which was later supplemented by the opening of a 12-screen cinema on the Broadway Plaza site in Birmingham in October 2003. AMC Theatres sometimes serve a dual function; in addition to the normal cinema functions, they also cater to companies' business conferences that can make use of their projectors for displaying presentations.

In 2004, AMC Theatres was acquired by Marquee Holdings Inc., an investment vehicle controlled by affiliates of J.P. Morgan Partners, LLC, the private equity arm of JPMorgan Chase, and Apollo Global Management, a private investment firm. At the time, AMC was publicly traded on AMEX under the code AEN.

In 2006, the company announced a new initial public offering (IPO) expected to be worth approximately $789 million; however, adverse market conditions convinced the company's management to withdraw from such an offering on May 3, 2007. The company filed for a $450 million IPO in its third such filing since 2006 on July 14, 2010.

Stanley Durwood died in 1999, and his successor was Peter Brown, the first non-Dubinsky/Durwood family member to head the company. Gerardo I. Lopez succeeded Brown as president and CEO of AMC Theatres on March 2, 2009. Previously, Lopez was the Executive Vice President of President Consumer Products Group, Seattle's Best Coffee, and Foodservice at Starbucks. Under new leadership, one of the first major announcements came in March of the same year; the company announced that it would equip 1,500 of its screens with Real D projectors. In the same month, AMC Theatres announced it had closed on a $315 million deal with Sony to replace all of its reel projectors with digital cinema projectors, starting in the second quarter of 2009 and completing in 2012.

The company was formerly headquartered in downtown Kansas City. In September 2011, AMC Theatres announced plans to move its headquarters to a new $30 million four-story building designed by 360 Architecture in the Park Place development at 117th Street and Nall Avenue in Leawood, Kansas in suburban Kansas City. The state of Kansas had offered $47 million in incentives to get the 400 jobs to move.

After reaching a settlement with the state of Illinois regarding complaints from a disability rights organization in April 2012, AMC pledged to equip all of its theaters in the state with captioning and description services by 2014. The disability rights group had accused the company of only providing closed captioning or audio description systems at some of its locations in the state.

Acquisition by Wanda Group (2012–2021) 
In May 2012, AMC Theatres was acquired by Chinese conglomerate Wanda Group, headquartered in Dalian, who paid $2.6 billion to acquire AMC's 5,048 screens in 347 theaters in the U.S. and Canada. The deal was finalized on September 4, 2012.  The acquisition made Wanda the world's largest cinema chain. Wang Jianlin, CEO of Dalian Wanda Group, announced that the company would plan to spend $500 million renovating AMC locations.

AMC Theatres had eight movie theatres in Canada. In July 2012, four locations were sold to Cineplex Entertainment, and two more locations were sold to Empire Theatres and later acquired by Landmark Cinemas. The two remaining locations have since closed.

Gerardo I. Lopez announced his resignation as CEO of AMC in August 2015. Craig Ramsey was appointed as the interim CEO by the company board. In December 2015, AMC announced that Adam Aron would be the company's president and chief executive officer, as well as a member of the company's board of directors, beginning on January 4, 2016.

In March 2016, AMC Theatres announced it would acquire competitor Carmike Cinemas. In July 2016, Carmike's management accepted a revised offer, pending regulatory and shareholder approval. The deal was closed on December 25, 2016, making AMC the largest cinema chain in the United States.

On March 1, 2017, AMC Theatres CEO Adam Aron stated that the company would rebrand Carmike Cinemas locations under the AMC name; smaller locations were rebranded under the new banner AMC Classic (which repurposes trademarks associated with Carmike). Aron also announced a plan to rebrand its kitchen-equipped theaters as AMC Dine-In.

In July 2017, AMC Theatres announced they would be cutting $30 million in expenses by the end of the year. This cost reduction would be accomplished by reducing operating hours, cutting staffing levels, and other measures.

In September 2018, Silver Lake Partners made a $600 million investment in AMC Theatres, whose proceeds were used to repurchase approximately 32% of Wanda Group's class B common stock.  However, the voting power of AMC's shares is structured in such a way (granting three votes per-share for each Class B share if its stake in the company is above 30%) that, even after reducing its ownership of AMC common stock to just under 50% by the end of 2019, Wanda Group continued to retain majority control over AMC's board of directors.

In October 2019, AMC began to offer on-demand rentals and purchases of digital film releases under the banner AMC Theatres On Demand. The service is tied to the company's Stubs loyalty program.

Impact of the COVID-19 pandemic 
On March 18, 2020, AMC announced the closure of all of its theaters due to the COVID-19 pandemic, in compliance with CDC guidance against any gathering of over ten people. AMC said this shutdown would last for at least six to twelve weeks. On March 25, 2020, AMC furloughed all of its 600 corporate employees, including CEO Adam Aron. All furloughed corporate AMC employees and associates retain their active employment status, including all health benefits.

On April 28, 2020, AMC announced they would no longer carry films from Universal Pictures after NBCUniversal CEO Jeff Shell commented in The Wall Street Journal that the studio wanted to release films via premium video on-demand simultaneously with theatrical releases. The company threatened that this will also be done with any other studio "who unilaterally abandons current windowing practices absent good faith negotiations between us, so that they as distributor and we as exhibitor both benefit and neither are hurt from such changes."

On June 3, 2020, AMC stated that it had "substantial doubt" that it would remain in business. On July 28, 2020, AMC and Universal were able to resolve their dispute, with AMC agreeing to a shorter theatrical window of 17 days before Universal could release their films via premium VOD, as well as revenue sharing on the premium VOD window.

On August 20, 2020, AMC began the process of reopening selected locations in the United States where allowed under local health orders. In honor of the company's centennial year, AMC also offered a special 15-cent ticket promotion that day, promoted as "Movies in 2020 at 1920 Prices." The company aimed for at least two thirds of its locations to be open in time for the September 3 release of Tenet. The company upgraded its air filtration systems to four times the rates before the pandemic and installed electrostatic sprayers in the auditoriums. In October 2020, the company reported that its existing cash resources "would be largely depleted by the end of 2020 or early 2021."

Stock surge, end of Wanda Group control 
On January 26, 2021, AMC stated that it had raised $917 million in new funding, including $506 million in equity and new common shares, and commitments for $411 million in debt financing. The company stated that this new funding "should allow the company to make it through this dark coronavirus-impacted winter". The next day, as part of a wider series of short squeezes coordinated by the Reddit community r/wallstreetbets (which primarily targeted video game retailer GameStop), AMC experienced a major, 300% surge in its share price to a peak of $20.36. The surge triggered Silver Lake Partners' convertible bonds; on January 28, it reached an agreement to convert $600 million of its debt holdings in AMC to equity at $13.51 per-share. Mudrick Capital Management made nearly $200 million in profit off its holdings of AMC debt.

On February 5, 2021, a U.S.-based subsidiary of Wanda Group issued a filing with the SEC, stating that it had converted its Class B common stock to Class A shares to permit their sale. While Wanda remains AMC's largest single shareholder, the conversion, as well as AMC's financing efforts taking its stake below 37%, effectively surrenders its majority control since Class A stock only provides one vote per-share.

During its fourth-quarter earnings call in March 2021, the company reported that its revenue had fallen by 88% year-over-year. CEO Adam Aron stated that AMC was facing the "most challenging market conditions in the 100-year history of the company", but cited progress on COVID-19 vaccinations, decisions to allow cinemas in New York City and Los Angeles to re-open, and a "significant" number of upcoming blockbuster films as signs of optimism. Aron also confirmed that Wanda no longer had majority control, and the company would now "be governed like most other publicly traded companies with a wide array of shareholders".

In June 2021, retail investors poured into AMC stock reaching an all time high of over $70. AMC issued more shares in June, but warned potential investors against buying the shares "unless you are prepared to incur the risk of losing all or a substantial portion of your investment". The cinema chain operator said it believed current prices reflected "market and trading dynamics unrelated to our underlying business".
In the year to date, shares in AMC had soared 2,421% – despite its cinemas being largely shut during the pandemic.

In August 2021, the company revealed plans to begin accepting cryptocurrencies such as Bitcoin for purchases in the future, which it did in November 2021 for online purchases via PayPal. In April 2022, AMC added integration with BitPay as a payment provider to its mobile app.

On August 4, 2022, AMC Entertainment Holdings Inc. took Wall Street by surprise with the announcement of its “APE” special dividend after market close. The AMC Preferred Equity Units will list on the New York Stock Exchange under the symbol “APE,” a nod to the investors who turned the company into a meme stock, who often refer to themselves as “apes” or “ape nation.” The stock gained 19% to $22.18 at the close in New York on Friday after initially falling following the announcement of the new units on Thursday.  The preferred shares started trading under the “APE” ticker on the New York Stock Exchange starting Aug. 22. AMC CEO Adam Aron stated "We are making great strides on our path towards pandemic recovery".

In February 2023 AMC announced plan to test a dynamic pricing model for tickets for showings that occur after 4pm based on seat location. Seats located near the front of the theatre and select ADA seats will be priced less then other seats and will only be made available to members of the Stubs rewards program and seats in the middle of the theatre will be priced more than the other non-front row seats. In addition, AMC Stubs A-List members will be able to reserve the expensive middle seats at no additional charge.

Features
AMC patented cup holder armrests in 1981. AMC also introduced stadium-style seating. The seats are placed on risers so that each person has an unobstructed view of the screen. In 1995, they introduced "Love Seat" style seating with retractable armrests so that there can be no barrier between two seats. 
In July 1994, AMC signed an agreement with Sony to begin installing SDDS (Sony Dynamic Digital Sound) in auditoriums, and began upgrading selected older auditoriums in 2003. On March 26, 2009, AMC announced an agreement to convert 1,500 existing auditoriums to fully digital 3D screens using RealD technology. On March 30, 2009, they announced they would convert all 4,500 screens in their chain to 4K digital projectors provided by Sony.

Premium formats
Selected AMC locations offer premium screens and features for a higher ticket price, including large-screen formats. Most theater locations are equipped to show 3D films in RealD 3D.

Dolby Cinema is a premium large format that features dual 4K laser projectors with Dolby Vision HDR, Dolby Atmos surround sound, and recliners with seat-mounted subwoofers. They also feature special entrance tunnels into the auditorium, with a video wall displaying content relating to the film being screened. Some Dolby Cinema screens were converted from the Prime and ETX formats.
IMAX auditoriums are available at many locations; IMAX digital or laser projectors are used in most locations, with a few using traditional 70 mm analog projectors.
Laser at AMC delivered by laser projection from Cinionic includes improved picture contrast compared to digital projectors, more vivid color, and maximum picture brightness, with guaranteed light levels that exceed most 2D digital projections. AMC signs exclusive agreement with Cinionic to install laser projectors in 3,500 of its U.S. auditoriums through 2026.

 Prime at AMC auditoriums feature large screens with Dolby Atmos, and recliners with seat-mounted subwoofers. In 2015, AMC began to replace Prime with Dolby Cinema at some locations.
BigD is a large-screen format inherited from the Carmike Cinemas chain, which uses a 70-foot screen and stadium seating with retractable armrests.

Defunct premium format
 ETX (Enhanced Theatre Experience) was a premium large format used in selected markets, which included larger screens, 12-channel surround sound, and digital projection (utilizing either Sony 4K projection or Christie DLP technology). Some auditoriums also included Dolby Atmos. In 2015, AMC began to replace ETX with Dolby Cinema.

Non-film formats
 Virtual Reality
 AMC Entertainment Holdings Inc invested $20 million in virtual-reality arcades and productions: $10 million to virtual reality entertainment company Dreamscape Immersive and another $10 million in a content fund.

Guest loyalty programs
AMC Theatres created the now-defunct MovieWatcher program that rewarded frequent movie-goers similar to other rewards programs but featured innovative aspects. It was based on a points-per-movie-ticket-purchased system, with rewards varying from concessions to movie passes based on point-based level. However, points were limited to a maximum of four points per three-hour time period, which was equal to two tickets. For the AMC cinemas that were not part of the Loews Cineplex acquisition and therefore ticketed by MovieTickets.com, the website's surcharge was waived for MovieWatcher members.

On April 1, 2011, AMC started a new rewards program known as AMC Stubs, which could be purchased for a fee of $12 for an entire year. For that initial fee, members would receive $5 on every $50 spent between the box office and the concession stand at any AMC theater nationwide. AMC Stubs members also received a free size upgrade with every popcorn and drink they purchase (for example, an AMC Stubs member can get a large popcorn for the price of a regular).

Other perks include birthday gifts and waived ticketing fees for online ticketing sites such as MovieTickets.com and Fandango and also online ticket purchases through AMC's own website and mobile app. Receipts or ticket stubs were required for manual adjustments. No more than four manual adjustments would be allowed per account in a single calendar month. Manual adjustments would be made for purchases made within 30 calendar days from date of original purchase.

As of March 29, 2012, AMC Stubs had 3.2 million members, which represents approximately 18% of AMC attendance during fiscal 2012. In July 2018, AMC Stubs was split into three programs that are currently still in-place: the free AMC Stubs Insider; the yearly fee-based AMC Stubs Premiere, which costs $15 annually and provides the same benefits as the original Stubs plus an expedited line at tickets and concessions; and the monthly fee-based AMC Stubs A-List, which includes up to 3 movie tickets a week to any film in any format for $19.95 to $23.95 a month, depending on the state the member plans to watch movies in. Discount Tuesdays is another feature every Tuesday for members to purchase tickets typically for just $6 to any film in most locations, with occasional exclusions, plus surcharges for premium formats such as 3D, IMAX, and Dolby Cinema, as well as special events.

MacGuffins Bar and Lounge
Some AMC locations have a bar service under the MacGuffins brand. These are primarily offered at AMC and AMC Dine-in locations, but some AMC Classic locations with liquor licenses offer their alcoholic beverages under this brand. Drinks can be ordered to be drunk in the bar and lounge area or taken into the theater. Some AMC Dine-in theaters have their MacGuffins set up as a full-service restaurant that can be accessed without having to pay for a movie ticket.

Vouchers
Several types of vouchers may be used at AMC Theatres.

 Black And Yellow tickets
 AMC sells Black and Yellow (formerly Red, Green, Gold, and Silver) tickets, typically priced from $8.50 to $10.25, that can be purchased in bulk at many retailers, like Costco and Sam's Club, as well as at AMC locations.  Both can be redeemed towards any movie, but yellow tickets cannot be redeemed in the states of California, New York, and New Jersey. Regardless of the ticket used, surcharges apply for special presentations and premium formats such as RealD 3D, Dolby Cinema, IMAX, among others.
 Gift cards
 AMC offers gift cards, which are sold at AMC theaters and by some retailers. They can be used to buy goods or services (such as tickets and food) both online and at AMC theaters.
 Snack vouchers
 AMC offers Show Snacks coupons. Some can be exchanged for a small popcorn, while others offer a small fountain drink. The chain also offers similar coupons via SMS or smartphone apps. Older coupons specially designed for the concession stand may be honored by AMC, at its discretion.

Banners
Following the acquisition of Carmike Cinemas, AMC began to unify its cinemas under one of three main banners in 2017:

 AMC serves as the flagship banner, covering conventional cinemas with premium features and formats available. Many of the former Loews Cineplex Entertainment theatres still use the Magic Johnson Theatres sub-brand as AMC Magic Johnson and, formerly until 2017, AMC Loews.
AMC Classic is used for smaller locations with fewer premium amenities. The brand is primarily used by the former Carmike locations, and use Carmike's "folded film" logo and "America's Hometown Cinemas" slogan. Since the Carmike purchase, some AMC Classic locations have undergone refurbishments to add expanded concessions options (including a larger menu, MacGuffins bars, and Coca-Cola Freestyle machines), upgraded AV equipment, and reclining seats, and switches from second-run to first-run films.
 AMC Dine-In is used for cinemas that offer expanded food service, including auditoriums with reserved seating and table service.

Other endeavors
AMC also formed a short-lived partnership with Planet Hollywood that failed due to that company's bankruptcy. The Planet Movies by AMC venture planned to open complexes worldwide with the objective of having icon locations in major metropolitan and other select areas, like Orlando and Columbus. Initially, seven existing, unnamed AMC megaplex theaters with more than 150 combined screens were to be re-branded under a license arrangement to incorporate certain elements of the new concept. The initial seven re-branded locations were to include markets such as Orlando, Florida. The AMC Pleasure Island 24 megaplex in Orlando, situated directly across from Planet Hollywood's most successful restaurant and retail unit and adjacent to Disney's Pleasure Island (now Disney Springs) was to be the first Planet Movies location.

After the initial seven, the joint-venture planned to own and operate all subsequent units including 8 to 10 complexes with 200 to 250 screens planned to open over the next 18 to 24 months. Over the longer term, the venture anticipated rolling out units at the rate of 5 to 10 per year. From almost the very start, the well-publicized financial strains on Planet Hollywood hindered the project. The only Planet Movies location to actually open, a 30 screen megaplex, did so in the summer of 1999 at Easton Town Center in Columbus, Ohio. The location was also located alongside an Official All Star Café and Planet Hollywood restaurant.

The continued poor financial performance of Planet Hollywood led the company to declare bankruptcy in December 1998, and even before the first location had opened stated that "the joint venture has no definitive plans to expand this concept once the Columbus site is completed". As Planet Hollywood was preparing to emerge from bankruptcy in October 1999 their re-organization plan emphasized focus back on their core restaurant business and away from side-ventures like Planet Movies and their Cool Planet ice cream chain.  The Planet Hollywood restaurant and All Star Café in Columbus were closed in late 2000, and the film memorabilia were also removed from the theater as it was rebranded AMC Easton 30, and continues to operate.  The Planet Movies by AMC joint venture was formally dissolved on January 9, 2001.

Both of the Disney Parks in the United States at one time included AMC movie theaters at their Downtown Disney sections: AMC Dine-In Disney Springs 24 all-stadium-seating megaplex with Dolby Cinema and Dine-In Theatres (opened in 1996) (formerly AMC Pleasure Island 24) at Walt Disney World Resort and AMC Downtown Disney 12 at Disneyland Resort stadium-seating multiplex (opened in 2001, closed in 2018). The AMC Citywalk Stadium 19 located on Universal Studios Hollywood's Citywalk was relaunched after a renovation as "Universal Cinema, an AMC Theatre", on April 21, 2017. This location includes a seven-story IMAX screen with IMAX Laser and IMAX 70mm film, as well as "Black Box"–inspired auditoriums.  It has one Christie Laser Projector per auditorium, with Dolby Atmos speakers. At Universal Studios Florida, AMC had the Universal Cineplex 20 (also a former Cineplex Odeon), until September 2018 when it became a Cinemark.

AMC Independent (also known as AMCi) is an AMC film distribution program that aims to help independent films reach a theatrical audience. The program was announced in 2010 via the AMC Blog, and has been responsible for promoting and distributing all independent films to AMC theaters since.

Acquisitions

AMC has acquired multiple other theater chains throughout its history, resulting in a total of 385 theaters with 5,128 screens in six countries:

In March 2002, AMC bought General Cinema Corporation, which added 66 theaters with 621 screens to the company assets, as well as Gulf States Theaters, which had five theaters with 68 screens in the greater New Orleans area. In late 2003, AMC acquired MegaStar Theatres, adding additional theaters in the Atlanta and Minneapolis–St. Paul markets.

On January 26, 2006, AMC merged with Loews Cineplex Entertainment to form AMC Entertainment; the deal brought into AMC's fold the entire Loews and American Cineplex chains, along with Magic Johnson Theatres (named after NBA player Magic Johnson) and Star Theatres, based in Metro Detroit. In 2010, AMC acquired Chicago-based Kerasotes Showplace Theatres, LLC for $275 million, combining the nation's second and sixth largest movie theater chains, except for the Showplace 14 in New Jersey and the Showplace ICON theatres.

In December 2015, Starplex Cinemas was sold to AMC for approximately $175 million. Most of these theaters now operate as AMC Classic as of July 2017.

On March 3, 2016, AMC announced its intent to acquire Carmike Cinemas in a $1.1 billion deal, pending regulatory and shareholder approval, which would allow it to overtake Regal as the United States' largest movie theater chain. The merger officially closed in December 2016.

In July 2016, UCI & Odeon Cinema Group was sold to AMC for approximately $1.21 billion, subject to European Commission approval. The acquisition was approved by the European Commission and the deal closed in November 2016.

In January 2017, Nordic Cinema Group, the leading movie theater operator in the Nordic and Baltic area, was sold to AMC for approximately $929 million. The deal was completed in March 2017 after AMC received clearance from the European Commission.

In July 2021, AMC Theatres announced that it would acquire the leases to the Americana at Brand in downtown Glendale and The Grove at Farmers Market in Los Angeles locations, formerly owned by Pacific Theatres, and that they would reopen in August as part of the AMC chain. The company has not ruled out acquiring the leases of other Pacific Theatres locations. In December 2021, AMC Theaters also announced that they had acquired the leases to the former Pacific Theaters location at Northridge Fashion Center in Northridge, Los Angeles and the Arclight Chicago 14 in Lincoln Park, Chicago, which both opened in 2022. In February 2022, AMC Theaters reached a deal to acquire the leases to the Arclight Montgomery 16 at Westfield Montgomery in Washington D.C. and the Westfield UTC mall's Arclight UTC 14 in La Jolla, with the former reopening that month and the latter in March of that year. During the same month, the company reached an agreement to acquire the lease to the Century 12 Evanston, previously owned by Cinemark Theatres, in Evanston, Illinois. In December 2022, the company reached a deal on the acquisition of the former Arclight Cinemas located at The Hub on Causeway in Boston.

In April 2022, AMC Theaters acquired seven Bow Tie Cinemas locations in Connecticut, New York, and Maryland.

Controversies
The early versions of stadium-style seating as built by AMC in 1995 had auditoriums configured with an entrance to a flat area immediately in front of the screen for wheelchair users.  People seated there had to either lean back or look up at an uncomfortable angle to see the screen. Able-bodied guests had to ascend the stairs to sit in the middle of the risers in order to have a comfortable line-of-sight with the screen. Since some wheelchair users have limited neck movement range, this configuration made AMC a popular target for Americans with Disabilities Act (ADA) lawsuits. AMC subsequently solved the problem in newer theaters by building full-stadium auditoriums where the main entrance is through a ramp that emerges onto a platform in the middle of the risers so that wheelchair users can enjoy optimal line-of-sight. However, the U.S. Department of Justice sued the company, and obtained an order requiring AMC to retrofit over 1,990 screens in 95 multiplexes and megaplexes across the United States.

The company successfully appealed the order to the U.S. Court of Appeals for the Ninth Circuit, which ruled on December 5, 2008 that the order was excessive and violated AMC's due process rights under the Constitution of the United States. AMC won by pointing out that the United States Access Board had not yet amended its guidelines for movie theaters to specifically require them to provide wheelchair guests sightlines that were as good as those from elevated risers, versus merely providing an unobstructed view of the screen. Therefore, the court ruled that it was unfair to AMC to retroactively hold it to a standard that did not exist at the time it began building stadium-style theaters.

When AMC announced that most of their theaters would reopen in mid-July 2020 during the COVID-19 pandemic, the initial announcement said masks would be recommended but not mandatory. AMC CEO Adam Aron stated, "We are strongly encouraging our guests to wear masks all across the country, but not requiring it" and "We did not want to be drawn into a political controversy... We thought it might be counterproductive if we forced mask wearing on those people who believe strongly that it is not necessary." After massive pushback from the public, Aron changed the policy to require masks: "This announcement prompted an intense and immediate outcry from our customers, and it is clear from this response that we did not go far enough on the usage of masks," Aron said.

Slogans 
"There Is A Difference" (1986–2002)
"Experience The Difference" (2002–2011)
"Where Movies Live" (2010–2012)
"AMC Amazing" (2012–2021)
"We Make Movies Better" (2021–present)

Gallery

See also 

 Cinemark Theatres
 Cineworld  
Regal Cinemas

References

External links

 
2010 initial public offerings
2012 mergers and acquisitions
2013 initial public offerings
American companies established in 1920
Cinema chains in Hong Kong
Companies listed on the New York Stock Exchange
Entertainment companies established in 1920
Movie theatre chains in the United States
1920 establishments in Missouri
Meme stock